Withington is an area and electoral ward of Manchester, England. It is represented in Westminster by Jeff Smith MP for Manchester Withington. The 2011 Census recorded a population of 13,422.

Councillors 
, three councillors serve the ward: Becky Chambers (Lab), Chris Wills (Lab Co-op), and Angela Gartside (Lab).

 indicates seat up for re-election.

Elections in 2020s 
* denotes incumbent councillor seeking re-election.

May 2022

May 2021

Elections in 2010s

May 2019

May 2018

May 2016

May 2015

May 2014

May 2012

May 2011

May 2010

Elections in 2000s

References 

Manchester City Council Wards
Withington